Constance is a female given name that derives from Latin and means "constant." Variations of the name include Connie, Constancia, and Constanze.

Notable people 
Constance of Antioch (1127–1163), only daughter of Bohemund II of Antioch
Constance of Aragon (1179–1222), Aragonese infanta
Constance of Arles (986–1034), third wife and queen of King Robert II of France
Constance of Austria (1588–1631), Queen consort of Poland
Constance of Burgundy (1046–1093), daughter of Duke Robert I of Burgundy
Constance of Castile, Duchess of Lancaster (1354–1394) second wife of John of Gaunt
Constance Markievicz (1868–1927), Irish countess and political activist
Constance, Queen of Sicily (1154–1198), also Holy Roman Empress (Dowager)
Constance of Portugal (1290–1313), daughter of King Denis of Portugal
Constance de Salm (1767–1845), poet and miscellaneous writer; through her second marriage, she became Princess of Salm-Dyck
Constance of Wrocław (c. 1221 – 1257), Princess of Silesia and the Duchess of Kuyavia
Constance of York (1374–1416), daughter of Edmund of Langley, 1st Duke of York
Constance, Duchess of Brittany (1161–1201), hereditary Duchess of Brittany
Constance, Duchess of Wodzisław (died 1351), Polish princess
Constance of Hungary (c. 1180 – 1240), second Queen consort of Ottokar I of Bohemia
Constance of Toulouse, daughter of Raymond VI of Toulouse
Constance Babington Smith MBE Legion of Merit FRSL (1912-2000), RAF Photographic Intelligence specialist who discovered the Nazi V-Weapon programme.  
Constance Baker Motley (1921-2005) the first African American woman elected to the New York State Senate and subsequently the first African American female federal judge.
Constance Bennett (1904–1965), American actress
Constance Bolton (née Beard, 1884–1949), New Zealand artist
Constance Briscoe (born 1957), British barrister
Constance Calenda (1415), Italian surgeon
Constance Marie Charpentier (1767–1849), French painter
Constance Collier (1878–1955), British-born American actress
Constance Coltman (1889–1969), British pastor
Constance Cox (1912–1998), British writer
Constance Cummings (1910–2005), American-born British actress
Constance Prem Nath Dass (1886–1971), Indian college administrator
Constance Demby (1939–2021), American musician
Constance Dowling (1920–1969), American actress
Constance, Duchess of Brittany (1161–1201)
Constance of France, Princess of Antioch (1078–1126)
Constance Ford (1923–1993), American actress
Constance Garnett (1861–1946), English translator
Constance Glube (born 1931), Canadian judge
Constance Ella Glynn, known as Connie Glynn (born 1994), English YouTuber and author
Constance Gordon-Cumming (1837–1924), British travel writer and painter
Constance Grewe (born 1946), German judge
Constance Le Grip (born 1960), French politician
Constance Hamilton (1862–1945), Canadian politician
Constance Cary Harrison (1843–1920), American writer
Constance Hopkins (1607–1677), English colonist and Mayflower passenger
Constance A. Howard (born 1942), American politician
Constance Hunting (1925–2006), American poet
Constance N. Johnson (born 1952), American politician
Constance Kamii, Swiss-born American educator
Constance Keene (1921–2005), American pianist
Constance Stuart Larrabee (1914–2000), South African photographer and war correspondent
Constance Lau (born 1991), Singaporean actress
Constance Lloyd (1858–1898), Oscar Wilde's wife
Constance Marie (born 1965), American actress
Constance Markievicz (1868–1927), Irish politician
Constance Menard (born 1968), French equestrienne
Constance Moore (1920–2005), American actress
Constanze Mozart née Weber (1762–1842), Austrian singer, wife and biographer of the composer Wolfgang Amadeus Mozart
Constance Naden (1858–1889), English poet
Constance Piers (1866–1939), Canadian journalist, poet, editor
Constance Reid (1918–2010), American author
Constance Rover (1910–2005), English historian
Constance Senghor (born 1963), Senegalese high jumper
Constance Lindsay Skinner (1877–1939), Canadian writer
Constance Spry (1886–1960), British florist and author
Constance Stone (1856–1902), Australian doctor
Constance Talmadge (1898–1973), American actress
Constance Tipper (1894–1995), British metallurgist
Constance Towers (born 1933), American singer and actress
Constance Fenimore Woolson (1840–1894), American novelist
Constance Wu (born 1982), American actress 
Constance Zimmer (born 1970), American actress

Fictional
Constance Blackwood, Character in Ride the Cyclone
Constance, the heroine of The Man of Law's Tale
Constanze, heroine of Mozart's opera The Abduction from the Seraglio
Constance Billard School, school in the television series Gossip Girl
Constance Blackwood, character in Shirley Jackson's novel We Have Always Lived in the Castle
Constance Bonacieux, an important character in the novel The Three Musketeers
Constance "Connie" Brooks (see Our Miss Brooks), fictional English language teacher
Constance "Connie" Chatterly, the main protagonist in D.H. Lawrence's final novel Lady Chatterley's Lover
Constance Contraire, character created by Trenton Lee Stewart in his Mysterious Benedict Society series
Constance, Lady Crabtree, character created by Paul James
Constance Greene, character in the Pendergast book series
Constance Langdon, one of the main characters from FX show American Horror Story
Constance MacKenzie, character in the 1956 novel Peyton Place by Grace Metalious
Constance Pemberton, character created by Brandon Mull in his Five Kingdoms series
Constance Hatchaway, a character in the Disney Haunted Mansion attractions
Constance Von Nuvelle, a character in the Fire Emblem series

See also
 
Constance (or Konstanz), a city in Germany bordering Switzerland
Constant (given name)
Constant (surname)

Romanian feminine given names